Roland Mack (born 12 October 1949) is a German entrepreneur. Mack grew up as a son of the entrepreneur Franz Mack, in Waldkirch. In 1975, he became the founder of Europa-Park in Germany.

Personal life 
Mack was born in Freiburg. He married Marianne Mack in 1974, and has two sons and a daughter. He is father of Michael Mack.

He was appointed King of Fun by the IAAPA in November 2011

References

20th-century German businesspeople
1949 births
Living people
Officers Crosses of the Order of Merit of the Federal Republic of Germany
Recipients of the Order of Merit of Baden-Württemberg
Knights of the Ordre national du Mérite
21st-century German businesspeople
Businesspeople from Freiburg im Breisgau